This is a list of Canadian television related events from 2007.

Events
A series of ownership changes radically reshaped the Canadian television broadcasting industry in 2007. Individual transactions are briefly noted below; for more information, see also 2007 Canada broadcast TV realignment.

Debuts (including scheduled)
See 2007–08 Canadian network television schedule for a complete grid of the networks' fall prime time programming.

Ending this year

Television shows

1950s
Hockey Night in Canada (1952–present, sports telecast)
The National (1954–present, news program)

1960s
CTV National News (1961–present)
Land and Sea (1964–present)
The Nature of Things (1960–present)
Question Period (1967–present, news program)
W-FIVE (1966–present, newsmagazine program)

1970s
Canada AM (1972–present, news program)
the fifth estate (1975–present, newsmagazine program)
Marketplace (1972–present, newsmagazine program)
100 Huntley Street (1977–present, religious program)

1980s
CityLine (1987–present, news program)
Fashion File (1989–2009)
Just For Laughs (1988–present)

1990s
CBC News Morning (1999–present)
Daily Planet (1995–present)
eTalk (1995–present, entertainment newsmagazine program)
The Passionate Eye (1993–present)
Royal Canadian Air Farce (1993–present)
This Hour Has 22 Minutes (1993–present)

2000s
Atomic Betty (2004–present, children's animated series)
The Best Years (2007–present)
Billable Hours (2006–present)
Call for Help 2.0 (2004–present, computer technical help series)
Canada's Worst Driver (2005–present, reality series)
Canadian Idol (2003–2008)
Captain Flamingo (2006–present, children's animated series)
CBC News: Sunday Night (2004–present)
Chilly Beach (2003–present, animated series)
Class of the Titans (2005–2008, animated series)
Corner Gas (2004–2009)
Le Cœur a ses raisons (2005–present)
Da Kink in My Hair (2007–present)
Degrassi: The Next Generation (2001–present)
Doc Zone (2006–present)
Dragons' Den (2006–present)
Durham County (2007–present)
ET Canada (2005–present)
Falcon Beach (2006–2007)
Global Currents (2005–present, newsmagazine/documentary series)
Grossology (2006–present, children's animated series)
Heartland (2007–present)
The Hour (2005–present, talk show)
Iggy Arbuckle (2007, animated series)
Instant Star (2004–2008)
Intelligence (2005–2007)
JR Digs (2001–present, comedy prank series)
Kenny vs. Spenny (2002–2010, comedy reality series)
Little Mosque on the Prairie (2007–2012)
Mantracker (2006–present, reality series)
Naturally, Sadie (2005–2007)
Paradise Falls (2001–present)
ReGenesis (2004–2008)
Restaurant Makeover (2005–2008)
Rick Mercer Report (2004–present)
Robson Arms (2005–2008)
6Teen (2004–present, animated series)
Total Drama Island (2007–2008, animated series)
Trailer Park Boys (2001–2008)
What's with Andy (2001–2007, children's animated series)
Whistler (2006–2008)

TV movies
 Booky and the Secret Santa (CBC Television, December 11)
 Crazy Canucks (CTV, December 15)
 In God's Country (CTV, January)
 Luna: Spirit of the Whale (CTV, May 13)
 St. Urbain's Horseman (CBC Television, October)

See also
 2007 in Canada
 List of Canadian films of 2007